Anatoly Petrovich Alexandrov (13 February 1903–3 February 1994), also known as A.P. Alexandrov, was a Russian physicist who played a crucial and centralizing role in the former Soviet program of nuclear weapons. 

During his lifetime, Alexandrov was the recipient of many honors, civil citations, and state awards for this work and was also the director of the Kurchatov Institute and the President of the Soviet Academy of Sciences from 1975 until 1986.

Early life
Anatoly Alexandrov was born on 13 February 1903 into the family of a prominent judge in the town of Tarashcha, Kiev Governorate, Russian Empire (now located in modern-day Ukraine).

In 1919, at the height of the Russian Civil War, Alexandrov graduated from high school in Kiev. The certificate gave the right to enter the university at the physics and mathematics or medical faculty. When the Red Army captured Kiev on February 5, 1919, Alexandrov and a friend were at a dacha in Mlynka. He and his friend encountered an officer of the White Guard, who urged them to enlist. They went to the front with the officer.

At the age of 16, he became a cadet and fought in the Army of Wrangel as a machine gunner, and was awarded three Crosses of St. George. During the evacuation of remnants of the White Guard army from Crimea to Turkey, Alexandrov refused to leave and preferred to stay. As a result, he was captured and sentenced to death, but he narrowly escaped.

Scientific career

Later he worked as an assistant at the Kiev Mining Institute as an electrician. He later worked as an electrical engineer at the Kiev Physicochemical Society under the Political Education and a high school teacher in the village of Belki, Kiev region. For several years, he combined his studies at the Physics and Mathematics Faculty of Kiev University, where he studied from 1924 to 1930, with teaching physics and chemistry at school#79 in Kiev.

After graduating from Faculty of Physics in Kiev University in 1930, he worked at the X-ray Physics Department in the Kiev Institute of Health. After his graduation in 1930, he was invited by Abram Ioffe to join him in Leningrad. At Leningrad Physicotechnical Institute, he developed a statistical theory of strength and doctoral dissertation - "Relaxation in Polymers" (1941).

From the spring of 1931, he worked at the Leningrad Polytechnic Institute, where he became a candidate, and then a professor of physical and mathematical sciences.

World War II
Alexandrov became prominent during World War II, when he devised in collaboration with Igor Kurchatov a method of demagnetizing ships to protect them from German naval mines, known as the LPTI system. On 9 August 1941, Alexandrov and Kurchatov arrived in Sevastopol to organize work on equipping the Black Sea Fleet ships with the system, and by the end of October it had been installed on more than 50 ships. At the same time, Alexandrov and Kurchatov continued research to improve it. The method was effective by the end of 1941 and was in active use through the end of the war and afterwards. It was successfully used by the Soviet Navy, during the Siege of Sevastopol, Siege of Leningrad, on the Volga River during the Battle of Stalingrad and in the Baltic Sea campaigns.

Later career

Both Alexandrov and Kurchatov worked at the Ioffe Institute by that time (their laboratory separated from the Ioffe Institute and moved to Moscow in 1943 for the work on the Soviet atomic bomb project).

From 1946 to 1955, he was director of the Institute for Physical Problems, where he was appointed to replace Pyotr Kapitsa. In 1955, he became deputy director of the Institute of Atomic Energy, and after the death of Kurchatov in 1960, he became its director. On the initiative of Alexandov, power plants for the nuclear icebreakers Lenin, Arktika, and Sibir were developed.

Alexandrov was a member of the Communist Party of the Soviet Union from 1962. It was under the leadership of Alexandrov, that technical, organizational and production problems were solved in an unprecedentedly short time during the construction of the USSR's first nuclear submarine with a nuclear propulsion system. As a result, in 1952-1972, Sevmash mastered the serial production of submarines with a nuclear propulsion system and became the largest nuclear submarine shipbuilding center in the USSR and the world. At Sevmash, 163 combat submarines were built. In the 1970s, the company produced Typhoon-class nuclear submarines, which entered into the Guinness Book of Records as the largest submarines in the world. 

In the 1960s, on the initiative of Alexandov, the largest helium liquefaction plant was built in the USSR . This provided a wide front for fundamental research in the physics of low temperatures, as well as on the technical use of superconductivity. He was the scientific supervisor of the project of RBMK reactor plants.

Described by colleagues as a brilliant scientist and organizer, he was deeply affected by the Chernobyl disaster, the worst nuclear accident in history. According to him:

"To manage such an institute as the IAE, the largest institute and the most difficult work, and at the same time take care of the Academy - I must say, it was extremely difficult. In the end it ended sadly. And when the Chernobyl accident happened, I believe that from that time both my life began to end, and my creative life."

The accident subsequently prompted the Soviet Government to review and suspend the ambitious nuclear power program. As principal designer of the RBMK reactor that exploded at Chernobyl, Alexandrov refused to concede that a design flaw contributed to the disaster.

Alexandrov died of cardiac arrest on 3 February 1994 in Moscow. He is buried at the city's Mitinskoe Cemetery.

Personal life
Alexandrov was first married to Antonina Mikhailovna Zolotareva, with whom he had a son Yuri, a physicist. Antonina died in 1947. Alexandrov later remarried to Marianna Alexandrovna Balashov. They had a daughter Maria, who became a biologist, and two sons Peter and Alexander. Peter became a physicist and Alexander became a biologist. Marianna died in 1986.

His nephew is Eugene Alexandrov, a Russian physicist and member of the Russian Academy of Sciences (since 1992).

Honours and awards

Army of Wrangel

Soviet Union	

	
Foreign		

Other awards
 Lenin Prize (1959)
 Stalin Prize (1942, 1949, 1951, 1953)
 Diploma of the Presidium of the Supreme Soviet of the Russian Federation (1993)
 Kurchatov Medal (1968)
 Lomonosov Gold Medal (1978)
 Vavilov Gold Medal (1978)
 XXXVIII Mendeleev Reader (4 February 1982)

References

External links 
 
 

1903 births
1994 deaths
People from Tarashcha
People from Tarashchansky Uyezd
Russians in Ukraine
Central Committee of the Communist Party of the Soviet Union members
Fifth convocation members of the Soviet of the Union
Sixth convocation members of the Soviet of the Union
Tenth convocation members of the Soviet of the Union
Eleventh convocation members of the Soviet of the Union
Heroes of Socialist Labour
Stalin Prize winners
Lenin Prize winners
Commanders with Star of the Order of Merit of the Republic of Poland
Recipients of the Cross of St. George
Recipients of the Lomonosov Gold Medal
Recipients of the Medal "For Distinction in Guarding the State Border of the USSR"
Recipients of the Order of Lenin
Recipients of the Order of the Red Banner of Labour
Recipients of the USSR State Prize
Soviet inventors
Soviet physicists
Soviet professors
Taras Shevchenko National University of Kyiv alumni
Presidents of the USSR Academy of Sciences
Foreign Members of the Bulgarian Academy of Sciences
Members of the German Academy of Sciences at Berlin
Members of the Royal Swedish Academy of Engineering Sciences
White movement people